Leptorhaphis is a genus of lichens in the family Naetrocymbaceae. Members of the genus Leptorhaphis are commonly called birchbark dot lichens.

Species
 Leptorhaphis atomaria 
 Leptorhaphis epidermidis 
 Leptorhaphis haematommatum 
 Leptorhaphis laricis 
 Leptorhaphis maggiana 
 Leptorhaphis novae-guineae 
 Leptorhaphis opuntiicola 
 Leptorhaphis tremulae

References

Pleosporales
Dothideomycetes genera
Lichen genera
Taxa named by Gustav Wilhelm Körber
Taxa described in 1855